(Young) Pioneers (alternately stylized as Young Pioneers or The (Young) Pioneers) was an American folk punk band from Richmond, Virginia, active from 1993 to 1999.  Composed of members of such influential bands as Born Against, Avail and Ted Leo and the Pharmacists, they released two albums and numerous singles on Vermiform and Lookout! Records.  An overtly political band, their lyrics ranged from "superfluous nods to radical heroes like George Jackson and Carlos the Jackal" to "describ[ing] the relationship between struggling individuals and the machinery of oppressive politics".

History
The band was formed by three former members of the hardcore punk group Born Against: singer and guitarist Adam Nathanson (also ex-Life's Blood), drummer Brooks Headley (also ex-Universal Order of Armageddon) and harmonica player Neil Burke (also ex-Life's Blood).  Burke's tenure was brief, and his departure after the group's debut EP on Vermiform Records was followed by Avail singer Tim Barry joining on bass guitar in 1994.  Barry was replaced in 1995 by bassist Marty Key, known as Marty Violence, shortly before the group signed to California-based punk rock label Lookout! Records.  Headley left the group in 1997 and was briefly replaced by Jonathan Fuller (of Sleepytime Trio) and more permanently by Fred LaPier, who played with the group through their final years.  After several tours with bands such as At the Drive-In,  Avail, Peechees, Karp and The Locust, they disbanded in February 1999.

Nathanson and Key continued to perform music together under the name Teargas Rock with drummer Randy Davis (of The Great Unraveling), although the group did not release any major releases and is currently on hiatus.  Key plays with Ted Leo and the Pharmacists and operates a record shop in Richmond, Steady Sounds. Headley performed in Wrangler Brutes and Skull Control, Fuller in Denali and Engine Down, and Burke in Men's Recovery Project, while Barry remained in Avail and became active as a solo artist.

Band members
Adam Nathanson – vocals, guitar, harmonica, keyboards (1993–1999)
Tim Barry – bass, vocals (1994–1995)
Marty Key – bass, guitar, drums, vocals, keyboards (1995–1999)
Neil Burke – harmonica (1993–1994)
Brooks Headley – drums, vocals (1993–1997)
Jonathan Fuller – drums (1997)
Fred LaPier – drums (1997–1999)

Discography
Albums
First Virginia Volunteers LP/CD (1995, Vermiform Records)
Free the Young Pioneers Now! LP/CD (1998, Lookout! Records)

Compilations
Crime Wave 10"/CD (1996, Vermiform Records)

Singles
Young Pioneers 7"(1993, Vermiform Records)
We March! 7" (1995, Vermiform Records)
Employeers Blacklist 7" (1995, Whirled Records/Irony Recordings)
V.M.Live Series Presents.. 7" (1996, V.M.Live Recordings)
On Trial 7" (1997, Lookout! Records)

Split releases
Split with The Van Pelt 7" (1995, Whirled Records)
The Fall of Richmond split with Avail 7" (1997, Lookout! Records)
Split with Drunk 7" (1997, What Else? Records)

Compilation appearances
The Last Great Thing You Did compilation (1997, Lookout! Records)
Forward Till Death compilation (1999, Lookout! Records)

References

External links

1993 establishments in Virginia
1999 disestablishments in Virginia
Folk punk groups
Punk rock groups from Virginia
Music of Richmond, Virginia
Musical groups disestablished in 1999
Musical groups established in 1993